Cəyirli (also, Dzhayirli and Dzheirli) is a village and municipality in the Barda Rayon of Azerbaijan.  As of 2008, it had a population of 853.

References 

Populated places in Barda District